The second season of the One Piece anime series was directed by Kōnosuke Uda and produced by Toei Animation. It contains a single story arc, called , which adapts Eiichiro Oda's One Piece manga from shortly after the beginning of the 12th through the beginning of the 15th volumes over 15 episodes, following the first adventures of Monkey D. Luffy's Straw Hat Pirates in a fictional sea, called the Grand Line. Stuck in the bowels of the giant whale Laboon, they encounter the whale's caretaker, an old man named Crocus, and Nefeltari Vivi. Taking her with them, they make enemies of the Warlord Sir Crocodile's secret organization, Baroque Works, and befriend the giants Dorry and Broggy on the prehistoric island Little Garden.

The season initially ran from March 21 through August 19, 2001 on Fuji Television in Japan. In Video Research's audience measurements in the Kantō region, these initial airings received household ratings ranging from 12.5 to 17.2, which earned every episode a place in Video Research's weekly Top 10 ranking of anime shows. Avex Entertainment released the season's episodes on VHS in five compilations, and on DVD in six compilations, each containing three episodes, between April 3 and September 4, 2002. In the English language adaptation of the series by former licensee 4Kids Entertainment, the season's 16 episodes were cut down to a mere four. They were first aired from July 30 though August 20, 2005 by the Fox Broadcasting Company as part of its Fox Box programing block. The series' new licensee, Funimation, released the season's episodes as part of their fifth and sixth uncut DVD compilations on June 30 and August 25, 2009.

Toei Animation's version makes use of four pieces of theme music (same amount from the previous season): one opening theme and three ending themes. The opening theme is "Believe" by Folder5 in Japanese and Meredith McCoy in English. The ending themes are "Run! Run!

Episode list

Critical reception 
D.F. Smith writing for IGN gave the season a 6/10 ("Okay") rating saying that "One Piece took an awfully long time to get rolling, but now that the cast is all together and the plot's got a good head of steam behind it, this is a first-rate kids' adventure show." and that "Now that the story's given them somewhere interesting to go -- and plenty of interesting foes to get in their way -- it's among the best animated popcorn around." Carl Kimlinger writing for Anime News Network gave the season's dub a B+ and the sub an A-, saying

Home releases

Japanese

VHS

DVD

Blu-ray
The Eternal Log contains 16:9 versions of the episodes in standard definition Blu-ray format.

English

4Kids

Uncut
In North America, this season was recategorized as part of a larger "Season Two", which contained episodes from the first five Japanese seasons, for its DVD release by Funimation Entertainment. The Australian Season Two sets were renamed Collection 5 and 6.

Notes

References

2001 Japanese television seasons
One Piece seasons
One Piece episodes